Stipagrostis ciliata, the tall bushman grass, is a species of grass in the family Poaceae. It occurs in Namibia Namib Desert and the Kalahari. It can be distinguished by a ring of long white hair surrounding each node.

References

Aristidoideae
Flora of Namibia